The 1994 Swedish Division 2 season.

The following are the statistics of the Swedish football Division 2 for the 1994 season.

League standings

Division 2 Norrland

Division 2 Östra Svealand

Division 2 Västra Svealand

Division 2 Östra Götaland

Division 2 Västra Götaland

Division 2 Södra Götaland

Division 1 qualification play-off 
1st round

2nd round

References
Sweden - List of final tables (Clas Glenning)

1994
3
Sweden
Sweden